The Royal Rotterdam Lloyd (Koninklijke Rotterdamsche Lloyd or KRL) was a Dutch shipping company that was established in Rotterdam between 1883 and 1970. Until 1947 the name was Rotterdamsche Lloyd (RL). In 1970 the KRL merged with several other Dutch shipping companies to form the Nederlandsche Scheepvaart Unie (NSU), known from 1977 as Nedlloyd.

History 

The Royal Rotterdam was founded on June 15, 1883 with seven ships, housed in joint shipping companies and under the management of Wm. Ruys & Zonen, were united in one company the company's origins date back to 1839 when the Rotterdam shipowner Willem Ruys (1809-1889) set sail for the Dutch East Indies and the Far East. As a result of the opening of the Suez Canal, his son Willem Ruys (1837-1901) expanded the company in 1872 with a steamboat service to Batavia.

In 1875 he founded the Partenrederij Stoomboot Reederij "Rotterdamsche Lloyd" himself, whose name was changed in 1881 to Stoomvaart Maatschappij "Rotterdamsche Lloyd", and which was eventually converted in 1883 into a public limited company under the name Rotterdamsche Lloyd NV.

During WWII 

Director Willem Ruys was arrested as a hostage by the German occupiers and executed in 1942. The shipping company lost at least ten ships in the western hemisphere as well as in Asian waters as a result of German and Japanese acts of war. Including the Slamat, Baloeran and Dempo. The cargo ship Kertosono was the first casualty of the German raider Thor in July 1940. The Slamat disaster on April 27, 1941 was the biggest disaster in Dutch merchant navy history, 983 people were killed, more than 450 of them from the Slamat.

After the war, the first new passenger ship of the shipping company, whose construction had already started in 1938, was christened Willem Ruys, after the director who had been killed.

Ships 

Passenger ships in particular became well known, such as Indrapoera (1926-1956), Baloeran (1930-1940), Dempo (1931-1944) and Willem Ruys (1947-1964). Cargo ships with passenger accommodation also arrived.

As a result of the Second World War, the creation of the state of Indonesia in 1949 and the disappearance of the old colonial connections, the KRL had to look for new areas of work. Smit-Lloyd was founded in 1964 together with Smit Internationale to operate platform supply vessels for the offshore.

Fate 

On January 20, 1970 the KRL merged with four other Dutch shipping companies to form the Nederlandsche Scheepvaart Unie (NSU), known as Nedlloyd from 1977. The archives of the KRL were transferred to the municipal archives of Rotterdam.

Trivia 

On the 25th anniversary of the Rotterdamsche Lloyd in 1908, the management was offered a model of the package boat Tabanan.

See also 

 Nedlloyd
 P&O Nedlloyd

External links 

  e.a. (red.), Maritieme Encyclopedie. Deel IV, Bussum, 1971, p. 132-133 
 , Rotterdamsche Lloyd, Houten, 1988 
 , Rotterdamsche Lloyd, Rosmalen, 2004 
 , Koninklijke Rotterdamsche Lloyd. Beknopte geschiedenis van een rederij, Zutphen, 2004 
 Inventory of the archives of the KRL in the Gemeentearchief Rotterdam
 Lloyd-Atelier website about the KRL.
 Schepenlijst

Defunct transport companies of the Netherlands
Defunct shipping companies of the Netherlands
Dutch companies established in 1883
1970 disestablishments in the Netherlands